Matriculation is the formal process of entering a university, or of becoming eligible to enter by fulfilling certain academic requirements such as a matriculation examination.

Australia
In Australia, the term matriculation is seldom used now. In the late 1960s and early 1970s, all states replaced the matriculation examination with either a certificate, such as the Higher School Certificate (HSC) in Victoria and New South Wales, or a university entrance exam such as the Tertiary Entrance Exam in Western Australia. These have all been renamed (except in New South Wales) as a state-based certificate, such as the Victorian Certificate of Education (VCE) or the Western Australian Certificate of Education (WACE).

Bangladesh
In Bangladesh, the "Matriculation" is the Secondary School Examination (SSC) taken at year 10, and the Intermediate Exams is the Higher Secondary Examination (HSC) taken at year 12. Bangladesh, like the rest of Indian sub-continent, still uses terms such as Matriculation Exams and Intermediate Exams taken from the days of the British Raj although in England itself these terms were replaced by 'O' or Ordinary Level Examinations (now called GCSEs) and 'A' or Advanced Level Examinations respectively.

Brazil

In Brazilian Portuguese, the word  refers to the act of enrolling in an educational course, whether it be elementary, high school, college or post-graduate education.

Canada
In Canada, the term is used by some older universities to refer to orientation ("frosh") events, however some universities, including University of King's College, still hold formal Matriculation ceremonies. The ceremony at King's is quite similar to the matriculation ceremonies held in universities such as Oxford or Cambridge. Trinity College at the University of Toronto also holds formal matriculation ceremonies, during which time incoming students are required to sign a matriculation register, making the practice the closest in format to that conducted by Oxford and Cambridge colleges of any university in North America. "F!rosh Week" at the University of Toronto's Faculty of Applied Science and Engineering also begins with a distinct Matriculation ceremony held at the university's Convocation Hall; though, there is no matriculation register to be signed, and the event is held by the student-run University of Toronto Engineering Society (through their Orientation Committee) rather than officially by the faculty. It is also where first-year engineering students take the "Hardhat Oath," a modified version of the Rifleman's Creed. At McGill University in Montreal, matriculation ceremonies have been substantially stripped down since the 1990s, although a speech by the Principal, typically held at Molson Stadium, to the incoming class is still a ritualized annual tradition.
In Ontario during the era with grade 13, satisfactory completion of grade 12 was considered junior matriculation and satisfactory completion of grade 13 was senior matriculation. In Nova Scotia, at the present time, Junior matriculation is grade 11 and senior matriculation is completion of grade 12.

Czech Republic
At Charles University in Prague, the oldest and most prestigious university in the Czech Republic, matriculation is held at the Great Hall (Magna Aula). The ceremony is attended by students commencing their studies. It is intended as a demonstration of the adoption of student's duties and obtaining of student's rights. The ceremony itself involves students taking the Matriculation Oath of the university and symbolically touching the faculty mace and shaking the dean's hand.

Other Czech universities hold ceremonies similar to the one just described.

Denmark
In Denmark, the University of Copenhagen holds a matriculation ceremony each year. The ceremony is held in the Hall of Ceremony in the main building of the university. The ceremony begins with a procession with the rector and the deans in academic dress and other regalia. The ceremony continues with the rector listing the different faculties, after which the different student, shouts when their respective faculty is mentioned. The rector then delivers a speech, after which the rector and the deans leave the ceremony again in procession, after which a party is held on university grounds, to mark the admission of the new students.

Finland

In Finland, Matriculation (Finnish: Ylioppilastutkinto, Swedish: Studentexamen) is the examination taken at the end of Secondary education to qualify for entry into University. In practice the test also constitutes the high school's final exams, although there is a separate diploma on graduating from high school, based not on the exam, but on the grades of individual courses. Since 1919, the test has been arranged by a national body, the Matriculation Examination Board. Before that, the administration of the test was the responsibility of the University of Helsinki (which until 1918 was the only university in Finland).

Germany
The German term Immatrikulation describes the administrative process of enrolling at university as a student. This can happen for winter semester and, depending on the degree program, also for summer semester. It does not involve a ceremony. A prerequisite for matriculation is generally the Abitur, which is the standard matriculation examination in Germany, for regular universities and Fachhochschulreife for Fachhochschulen (Universities of Applied Sciences). Both Abitur and Fachhochschulreife are school leaving certificates which students receive after passing their final examinations at some types of German secondary schools.

Hong Kong

In Hong Kong, the term is used interchangeably with the completion of sixth-form. After sitting for the Certificate of Education examinations, eligible students receive two years of sixth-form education, upon completion, they sit for the A-level examinations. Most secondary schools offer the sixth-form programme, and there are also a few sixth-form colleges. Students obtaining good grades in the A-level examinations will be admitted to a university. The education reforms of Hong Kong in the 2000s have replaced the fourth- and fifth-form education, which prepared students for the HKCEE, and the sixth-form education with a three-year senior secondary education, which leads to the Hong Kong Diploma of Secondary Education Examination. The last sixth-form students graduated and took the A-level examinations in 2012; in the same year the first students studying the new senior secondary curriculum graduated and took the first HKDSE examinations.

India

In India, matriculation is a term commonly used to refer to the final results of the 10th class, which ends at tenth 
Board (tenth grade), and the qualification consequently received by passing the national board exams or the state board exams, commonly called "matriculation exams".

India still uses terms such as Matriculation Exams and Intermediate Exams for Class 10th and Class 12th Board Exams respectively, taken from the days of British rule although in England these terms have been replaced by 'O' or Ordinary Level Examinations (now called GCSEs) and 'A' or Advanced Level Examinations.

English is the standard language for matriculation for science subjects, while regional languages are also an option. Most students who pass matriculation, or class 10, are 15–16 years old. Upon successfully passing, a student may continue onto the Higher secondary school. Most students who pass class 12 are 17–18 years old. The CBSE and ICSE boards conduct twelfth standard courses nationally, while state boards operate at the state-level. Although the basic curriculum is prescribed by the CBSE & almost all the competitive exams for entering in various universities in India are based on CBSE syllabus, various scholarships are also provided to students appearing for matriculation exams like NTSE, NSO, NSTSC etc.

Malaysia

In Malaysia, matriculation programmes are run by public universities and the Ministry of Education (MoE). Matriculation programmes offered by public universities offer fewer options for further study upon completion of the said program as they are limited to that particular university.

The matriculation programme provided by the MoE is a one-year pre-U program sponsored by the Malaysian government. SPM (Sijil Pelajaran Malaysia or the Malaysian Certificate of Education) holders can apply for MoE Matriculation during their SPM year [Form 5]. Students that are offered the matriculation programme will be posted to several Matriculation Colleges within Malaysia.

After MoE Matriculation, they can further their studies in local universities within Malaysia. Several universities in United Kingdom, Australia and New Zealand recognize the MoE Matriculation as a pre-U qualification.

Apart from the matriculation programmes, there is the STPM programme ([Sijil Tinggi Pelajaran Malaysia] or Malaysian Higher School Certificate), the standardised national examinations taken by Form 6 students. STPM is different from the matriculation programme in terms of its duration (2 years vs. 1 year), syllabus (breadth and depth), marking method (standardised assessment nationwide vs. assessment by matriculation college itself) and passing rate.

Nepal

In Nepal, it refers to the School Leaving Certificate (SLC) before now it is known as Secondary education examination (SEE) (As per new education act 2016) taken at year 10, before Intermediate Exams (Higher Secondary or 10+2) taken in subsequent two years prior to university entry. School leaving certificate (SLC) or Secondary education examination (SEE) is the main examination which is also called "Iron gate" in Nepal. Although SLC and 10+2 are widely used, some educational institutions follow the British system with O' or Ordinary Level Examinations (now called GCSE) and A' or Advanced Level Examinations respectively.

Netherlands
In the Netherlands high school is vertically segregated into several levels of education. Most students enter university after a specific high-school track, the pre-university education (Voorbereidend Wetenschappelijk Onderwijs). This track is concluded by the Central Exam (matriculation examination) regulated by Dutch law. After three years of the pre-university education program, high-school students select one of four directions (roughly corresponding to languages, humanities and economics, biology and medicine, and hard sciences), the last three years of the pre-university education program is meant to prepare for university education within that direction.

Pakistan

In Pakistan, matriculation (usually referred to as matric) is the term that refers to the final examinations that take place at the end of 9th and 10th grades. These examinations are usually taken up by students aged 14 to 16 years.

It results in the issuance of Secondary School Certificate (SSC) or Technical School Certificate (TSC). After the SSC (or TSC), students may proceed for 11th year of education at a higher secondary school. After successful completion of 11th (HSSC-1) and 12th (HSSC-2) years in college, they get the Higher Secondary School Certificate (HSSC) and become eligible to enter universities in Pakistan or in other countries. Pakistan still uses terms such as Matriculation Exams and Intermediate Exams taken from the days of British rule, although in England itself these terms were replaced with 'O' or Ordinary Level Examinations (now called GCSEx) and 'A' or Advanced Level Examination.

South Africa

In South Africa, matriculation (or matric) is the final year of high school and the qualification received on graduating from high school, and the minimum university entrance requirements. The first formal examination was conducted in South Africa under the University of the Cape of Good Hope in 1858.

South African universities do not set their own entrance examinations, although many use standardized entrance tests of linguistic, numerical and mathematical ability, called the National Benchmark Tests, split into the AQL Test (Academic and Quantitative Literacy) and the Mathematics Test.

United Kingdom
In the British universities of Oxford, Cambridge, St Andrews, Edinburgh, Durham, and the New College of the Humanities, the term is used for the ceremony at which new students are entered into the register (in Latin matricula) of the university, at which point they become members of the university. Oxford requires matriculants to wear academic dress with subfusc during the ceremony. At Cambridge and Durham, policy regarding the wearing of academic dress varies amongst the colleges. Separate matriculation ceremonies are held by some of the colleges in Durham. Also at Durham, not all students are entered into the register, but one person from each college is selected to sign their own name for the whole college. At the University of St Andrews as well as the other ancient universities of Scotland, matriculation involves signing the Sponsio Academica, a pledge to abide by university rules and to support the institution. In 2015, Bishop Grosseteste University Lincoln introduced a Matriculation event for all new students.

At most British universities there is no formal ceremony. The term matriculation is not used by many, with the terms enrolment and registration being more commonly employed to describe the administrative process of becoming a member of the university.

At Oxford and Cambridge, matriculation was formerly associated with entrance examinations taken before or shortly after matriculation, known as Responsions at Oxford and the Previous Examination at Cambridge, both abolished in 1960. University-wide entrance examinations were subsequently re-introduced at both universities, but abolished in 1995. More limited subject-based tests have since been introduced.

United States
In the United States, universities and colleges that have a formal matriculation ceremony include Adrian College, Albion College, Anna Maria College, Asbury University, Assumption College, Belmont Abbey College, Belmont University, Boston College, Boston University, Carnegie Mellon University, The Citadel, The Military College of South Carolina, Columbia University, Culver-Stockton College, Dartmouth College, Duquesne University, Hamline University, Harvard University, Jacksonville University in Jacksonville, FL, Kalamazoo College, Kenyon College, Lawrence University, Lyndon State College, Lyon College, Marietta College, McKendree University, Mount Holyoke College, Mount Union College, Moravian College, Muhlenberg College, Occidental College, Randolph-Macon College, Rice University, Saint Leo University, Scripps College, Trinity College, Tufts University, the University of Saint Mary (Kansas), University of Wisconsin–Baraboo/Sauk County, Virginia Military Institute, Wabash College, Walsh University, Washington and Jefferson College, and Willamette University. Some medical schools highlight matriculation with a white coat ceremony. For example, UAB School of Medicine does so.

At most universities and colleges in the United States, matriculation refers to mere enrollment or registration as a student at a university or college by a student intending to earn a degree, an event which involves no special ceremony.

Special student
Universities and colleges in the United States commonly have a category of students known as special students, non-matriculated students or non-matriculating students. Generally these are students who are not merely auditing a class, but receive credit which is potentially transferable, pay full tuition, and often receive benefits that other students receive such as access to facilities and health care. These students typically are enrolled as matriculated students at other institutions and are visiting scholars of some type. However, sometimes students attend classes for the purpose of a standalone non-degree education.

See also
 Matriculation examination
Matriculation certificate

References

External links
 

Academic terminology
Standardized tests
School qualifications